B4U Bhojpuri is a Bhojpuri - language 24/7 movie channel that was owned by B4U Network.

They show newly released Bhojpuri and Bhojpuri dubbed movies as well as films produced by B4U Motion Pictures. This channel broadcasts mainly in Bihar, Jharkhand and Uttar Pradesh

Current broadcast 
Bhajan Sagar

Former broadcast 
Kawariya Bole Bam Bam

See also 
 B4U Motion Pictures
 B4U Music
 B4U (network)
 List of Bhojpuri-language television channels

References

External links 
 Official site

Bhojpuri-language television
Television channels and stations established in 2019
Hindi-language television stations
Television stations in Mumbai

Movie channels in India